Wilhelm "Willy" Neuenhofen (24 April 1897 – 24 January 1936) was a German pilot.
His career as a pilot began with the German military in the First World War, where he became a Flying Ace obtaining 15 air victories.

On May 26, 1929, Neuenhofen set a world altitude record of 12,739 m (41,795 ft) flying a Junkers W 34 be/b3e

He was killed in 1936 whilst on a test flight in a Junkers Ju 87.

Sources of information

1897 births
1936 deaths
German World War I flying aces
Military personnel from Mönchengladbach
Aviators killed in aviation accidents or incidents in Germany
Flight altitude record holders